Fitchia spinosula is a species of assassin bug in the family Reduviidae.  It is found in North America.

References

Further reading

 
 
 

Reduviidae
Insects described in 1872
Hemiptera of North America